Monthly Prescribing Reference (MPR) is an online medical website and monthly drug reference publication based in New York City.

Background
Prescribing Reference, Inc., was established in 1984 by Haymarket Medical, a subsidiary of Haymarket Media. MPR was launched in 1985 and is PRI's first and main publication.

American medical websites
Companies based in New York City
Publications established in 1984